Secret of the Sphinx is a 1964 film, directed by Duccio Tessari, which stars Tony Russel, Salah Zulfikar, Maria Perschy, Ivan Desny, and Manuela Kent.

Plot
The story unfurls like an Italian Giallo as a group of people meet under strange circumstances, and one by one they are murdered.

Thomas and Hélène meet in Cairo as a Lloyd's of London agent investigates an Egyptian bank robbery. The booty remained buried in the sand and comes back to light following archaeological excavations. The agent suspects that the band of robbers is hiding among the archaeologists who are carrying out the excavations and, in fact, when the expedition returns to Cairo, he discovers that the chests contain the gold stolen from the bank.

Production
The exteriors of the film were shot in Egypt, while Cinecittà was chosen for the interiors.  The camera operator was the famous director Joe D'Amato, here credited with his real name, Aristide Massaccesi. The soundtrack was composed by Mario Migliardi.

Tony Russel liked the script and especially the idea of going to Egypt and he accepted the job by turning down the lead in A Fistful of Dollars.  He was the only one of his Italian films that he did not dub in English, despite being one of the main voice actors of Italian films. In addition, he had a love affair with Maria Perschy which he ended to stay with his wife. Salah Zulfikar was cast for the character of the Egyptian police officer in the film.

Reception 
The film was released in Italy on 4 September 1964 and foreign sales were entrusted to Galatea S-p.A. From Rome. It was released in West Germany in 1964 by "Gloria" under the title Heiße Spur - Kairo-London, in Spain by "Distribuidora Cinematograficas Rosa Films, S.A."  with the title La esfinge sonrie ...antes de morir and was released in France on 5 July 1967 with the title Du grisbi au Caire. In the United States it was released on DVD and VHS in 2004 by "Something Weird Video" (SWV) under the title Secret of the Sphinx.

Cast
Tony Russel: Thomas
Salah Zulfikar: Ahmed
Maria Perschy: Hélène Blomberg
Maria Laura Rocca: Martha
Ivan Desny: Professor Green
Gigi Ballista: Agent of Lloyd's of London
Giuseppe Fortis: Alain Nol
Evar Maran: Tchurov
Tullio Altamura
Franco Ressel
Joe Kamel

See also
 1964 in film
 List of Italian films of 1964
 Salah Zulfikar filmography

References

External links
Euro Trash Cinema article

1964 films
1960s adventure thriller films
Italian adventure thriller films
West German films
1960s Italian-language films
Films directed by Duccio Tessari
Films set in Egypt
Treasure hunt films
1960s Italian films